Dancing on Water is an album by Peter Kater, released on September 1, 2017. It earned Kater a Grammy Award for Best New Age Album at the 60th Annual Grammy Awards (2018).

References

2017 albums
Grammy Award for Best New Age Album
New-age albums by American artists